The Confederation of Mountain Peoples of the Caucasus (until 1991 known as Assembly of Mountain Peoples of the Caucasus) was a militarised political organisation in the Caucasus, active around the time of before the collapse of the Soviet Union and after, between 1989 and 2000. It played a decisive role in the 1992–1993 war between Abkhazia and Georgia, rallying militants from the North Caucasian republics. Its forces have been accused by Georgia of committing war crimes, including the ethnic cleansing of Georgians. The Confederation has been inactive since the assassination of its second leader, Yusup Soslanbekov, in 2000.

Creation

On the initiative of the Abkhaz ethno-nationalist movement Aidgylara, the Assembly of the Mountain Peoples of the Caucasus was established in Abkhazia's capital Sukhumi on 25 and 26 August 1989. On 13 and 14 October 1990, the Assembly held its second congress in Nalchik, where it was transformed into the so-called Mountain Republic. On 4 November 1990, in Nalchik, its membership was expanded. Sixteen nations of the Caucasus joined the Confederation. The Assembly elected the president (Musa Shanibov) and 16 vice presidents. Yusup Soslanbekov was the  chairman of the Caucasian Parliament and Sultan Sosnaliyev was appointed the head of the Confederation's military department. A third assembly was held in Sukhumi on 1 and 2 November 1991, when the organization was renamed to the Confederation of Mountain Peoples of the Caucasus.

War in Abkhazia

Following the outbreak of war as Georgian troops entered Abkhazia in August 1992, the Confederation held its 11th parliamentary session in Grozny. A clear purpose of the establishment of this organization became obvious after this Session. The Confederation created assault detachments of volunteers that were later deployed in Abkhazia during the war. The confederation raised about 1,500 volunteers, half of them reportedly from Chechnya. It has also been reported that notorious Chechen warlord Shamil Basayev became commander of CMPC forces in 1992.

The president of the Confederation, Musa Shanibov, and the chairman of the parliament, Iysuph Soslanbekov, made an official statement: "As there is no other way to withdraw Georgian occupants' army from the territory of the sovereign Abkhazia and in order to implement the resolution of the 10th Session of the CMPC, we order:

 All headquarters of the Confederation have to dispatch volunteers to the territory of Abkhazia to crash the aggressor militarily. 
 All military formations of the Confederation have to conduct military actions against any forces who oppose them and try to reach the territory of Abkhazia by any method. 
 To announce Tbilisi as a zone of disaster. At that use all methods, including terrorist acts. 
 To declare all people of Georgian ethnicity on the territory of Confederation as hostages. 
 All type of cargoes directed to Georgia shall be detained."

The Central Headquarters of the Confederation, led by Yusup Soslanbekov, had been in charge of implementing practical measures against the "enemies of Abkhazian people". CMPC forces took part in the storming operation of Gagra where hundreds of civilians were killed.

On October 3, Abkhazian and Confederate formations launched a full-scale attack on the villages of Kamani and Shroma (near Gumista River) that was repelled by Georgian forces.

Sukhumi Massacre

On September 27, 1993 the Abkhaz side violated the UN-mediated cease-fire agreement (the Georgian side had agreed to pull out all heavy artillery and tanks from Sukhumi in return for a cease-fire) by storming defenceless Sukhumi. The Confederates moved into Sukhumi and started to sweep through the streets of the city. As the city was engulfed by heavy fighting, civilians took refuge in abandoned houses and apartment buildings. Some of the civilians of Georgian ethnicity were massacred after their discovery by the Confederates. By late afternoon the remainder of the Georgian troops surrendered to the Abkhaz side. The majority of Georgian POWs were executed on the same day by Abkhaz formations and Confederates. Few civilians and military personnel managed to survive the massacre. The massacre continued for two weeks after the fall of Sukhumi (See Ethnic cleansing of Georgians in Abkhazia).

Later history 
Following the Abkhazian war, the Confederation went into a period of decline due largely to the feuds among its pro- and anti-Kremlin factions. It experienced a brief revival in December 1994, when Shanibov rallied thousands across the North Caucasus to block roads to the Russian forces heading to Grozny. However, the change of power in Shanibov’s home republic, Kabardino-Balkaria, in favor of a strongly pro-Moscow leader prevented him from exerting any political influence in the region, forcing him to retire from politics in 1996. Since then, the organization has had no role in Caucasus affairs. It never disbanded, but has been completely inactive since Shanibov’s successor, Yusup Soslambekov, was assassinated in Moscow on July 27, 2000.

Its forces have been accused (inter alia by Georgian State Commission of Ascertaining Facts of the Policies of Ethnic Cleansing and Genocide) of committing war crimes, including the ethnic cleansing of Georgians.

References 

Abkhaz–Georgian conflict
Politics of Russia
Adygea
Abkhazia
Chechnya
Chechen nationalism
Circassian nationalism
Dagestan
Ingushetia
Kabardino-Balkaria
Karachay-Cherkessia
Ossetia
South Ossetia